Andrea Wilkens (born October 16, 1984) is a German football midfielder currently playing for VfL Wolfsburg in the Bundesliga.

References

1984 births
Living people
German women's footballers
Women's association football midfielders